The 2010 United Bowl was the second title game of the Indoor Football League (IFL). It was played on July 17, 2010, at the Billings Sports Plex in Billings, Montana. The top seed in the Intense Conference (Billings Outlaws) defeated the United Conference's two-seed team, Sioux Falls Storm, by a score of 43–34.

Road to the United Bowl

United Conference

Intense Conference

Playoffs
z=clinched top seed in conference, x=clinched division, y=clinched wild card spot

2010 Indoor Football League season
United Bowl
Billings Outlaws
Sioux Falls Storm
2010 in sports in Montana
American football in Montana
Sports competitions in Montana
July 2010 sports events in the United States
Sports in Billings, Montana